Mahmoud Shakibi (1922 – 12 July 2021) was an Iranian footballer who played for the Iran national team and Shahin F.C. in the 1940s and 1950s.

Club career
As a student of Firouz Bahram High School located in Tehran, Shakibi was discovered by Abbas Ekrami his physics and Physical Education teacher. Dr. Ekrami was the founder of Shahin Football Family of Clubs, i.e. Shahbaz F.C., Shahin F.C., Oghab F.C., etc. In 1943, Shakibi joined Shahbaz F.C. He then joined Shahin F.C. in 1948 and enjoyed 11 years of playing for that club.

International career
Shakibi scored one goal for the Iran national team in a match against the Pakistan national football team on 27 October 1950 in a friendly match in Tehran that ended 5–1 for Iran.

He also participated in the 1951 Asian Games.

Honours
Shahin FC
 Iranian Hazfi Cup: 1948, 1949, 1950; runner-up 1953, 1957, 1959
 Tehran Football League: 1951, 1958; runner-up 1947, 1949, 1956

Iran
Asian Games Silver medal: 1951

References

Kayhan Publishing, Special Edition 30 Years of History of Persepolis F.C., From Shahin to Piroozi

1927 births
2021 deaths
People from Tehran
Iranian footballers
Association football defenders
Iran international footballers
Asian Games silver medalists for Iran
Asian Games medalists in football
Footballers at the 1951 Asian Games
Medalists at the 1951 Asian Games
Shahin FC players